Toledo Island is the southern of two rocky islands in Smyadovo Cove on the west coast of Rugged Island in the South Shetland Islands. The area was visited by early 19th century sealers.

The island is named after Joaquín de Toledo y Parra (1780–1819), Captain of the Spanish warship San Telmo that sank with 644 men on board off the north coast of Livingston Island in September 1819.

Location
Spanish mapping in 1992 and Bulgarian mapping in 2009.

Maps
 Península Byers, Isla Livingston. Mapa topográfico a escala 1:25000. Madrid: Servicio Geográfico del Ejército, 1992.
 L.L. Ivanov. Antarctica: Livingston Island and Greenwich, Robert, Snow and Smith Islands. Scale 1:120000 topographic map. Troyan: Manfred Wörner Foundation, 2010.  (First edition 2009. )
 Antarctic Digital Database (ADD). Scale 1:250000 topographic map of Antarctica. Scientific Committee on Antarctic Research (SCAR). Since 1993, regularly upgraded and updated.
 L.L. Ivanov. Antarctica: Livingston Island and Smith Island. Scale 1:100000 topographic map. Manfred Wörner Foundation, 2017.

References
 Bulgarian Antarctic Gazetteer. Antarctic Place-names Commission. (details in Bulgarian, basic data in English)
 Toledo Island. SCAR Composite Antarctic Gazetteer.

External links
 Toledo Island. Copernix satellite image

Islands of the South Shetland Islands
Bulgaria and the Antarctic